Dorel Stoica (born 15 December 1978, in Drobeta-Turnu Severin) is a Romanian footballer. He manages and plays for Tractorul Cetate.

Club career
He started his career with Extensiv Craiova in 2003. A year later, he moved to FC Caracal. In 2005, Stoica was transferred to Universitatea Craiova where he made his breakthrough in Romanian football. Later, he became captain of Universitatea and joined the national team. On 5 January 2010, his move to Saudi Arabian side Al-Ettifaq was made official. He signed a 6-month contract, with a monthly payment of €30,000.

Steaua București
In June 2010, the former captain of Universitatea Craiova moved back in Romania to play for Steaua București in Liga 1, following coach Victor Pițurcă.

In his first match for Steaua, Dorel scored a goal at the Stadionul Cetate. He equalled the score in the 45th minute after Claudiu Niculescu opened the score in the 8th, Steaua won away with 2–1.

Universitatea Craiova
After only two months playing for Steaua he was sold back to Universitatea Craiova, because coach Victor Piţurcă resigned before round three of the new season and the new coach Ilie Dumitrescu no longer needed his services.

Dinamo București
Following Universitatea Craiova's disaffiliation, Stoica became a free agent and joined Dinamo București, on a two-year contract, entering the list of footballers who played for the great rivals Steaua and Dinamo. In the summer of 2012, he was released from Dinamo by mutual agreement. He played for giants 10 caps and score 1 goal, in a match against FC Vaslui. The team won the Romanian Cup in May 2012.

CS Turnu Severin
In February 2013 he moved to CS Turnu Severin. He was released in summer 2013.

Back to Universitatea Craiova
In July 2013, the 34-year-old Stoica returned to Universitatea Craiova, the club where he spent the majority of his career.

International goals 
Scores and results list Romania's goal tally first. "Score" column indicates the score after the player's goal.

Honours

Club
Dinamo București
Romanian Cup (1): 2011–12

References

External links
 
 

1978 births
Living people
People from Drobeta-Turnu Severin
Romanian footballers
Romania international footballers
FC U Craiova 1948 players
FC Steaua București players
FC Dinamo București players
Ettifaq FC players
CS Turnu Severin players
Liga I players
Expatriate footballers in Saudi Arabia
Saudi Professional League players
Association football central defenders